Bantian station is a Metro station on Line 5 of the Shenzhen Metro. It opened on 22 June 2011. It is located at the junction of Bulong Road and Banxuegang Road.

Station layout

Exits

References

External links
 Shenzhen Metro Bantian Station (Chinese)
 Shenzhen Metro Bantian Station (English)

Shenzhen Metro stations
Railway stations in Guangdong
Longgang District, Shenzhen
Railway stations in China opened in 2011